Brian Coburn (born ) is former politician in Ontario, Canada. He sat in the Legislative Assembly of Ontario from 1999 to 2003, representing the riding of  Carleton—Gloucester (renamed as Ottawa—Orléans) for the Progressive Conservative Party. Coburn was a cabinet minister in the government of Mike Harris and Ernie Eves.

He is not to be confused with the person of the same name who represents the same area on the Ottawa-Carleton Catholic School Board.

Background
Coburn was educated at Brock University in St. Catharines. A small businessman, he served for ten years as the Mayor of Cumberland. Coburn also served on the Board of Governors for Algonquin College in Ottawa. As mayor, he earned a reputation for fiscal prudence.

Politics
Coburn was elected for Carleton—Gloucester in the provincial election of 1999, defeating Liberal Ren Danis by over 6,000 votes.  This was considered a major upset. The riding had been solidly Liberal for many years, and most observers thought Danis would win an easy victory. Coburn's win may be attributed to personal popularity and a local issue: many residents saw construction workers from Quebec as a threat to local employment, and voted Tory to protest the situation.

After sitting as a backbencher for two years, Coburn was appointed to the government of Mike Harris as Minister of Agriculture, Food and Rural Affairs on February 8, 2001.

In 2002, Coburn endorsed Ernie Eves to succeed Mike Harris as leader of the Progressive Conservative Party. When Eves became Premier on April 15, 2002, he named Coburn Associate Minister of Municipal Affairs and Housing with Responsibility for Rural Affairs.  On February 25, 2003, Coburn was moved to the Minister of Tourism and Recreation.

Coburn carried the banner of an increasingly unpopular party into the 2003 provincial election. The presence of Quebec workers was no longer an issue, and many local residents were angered by increased energy rates under the Harris and Eves governments. Despite gaining endorsements from several local newspapers, Coburn lost to Liberal Phil McNeely, another municipal politician, by about 4,500 votes.

In 2004, he endorsed Frank Klees for the leadership of the Ontario PC Party.

Cabinet positions

Electoral record

Later life
Coburn was appointed as a Citizenship Judge for Ottawa, Ontario in October 2006. Brian Coburn Boulevard, an arterial road in Orleans, is named after him.

References

Notes

Citations

External links

1945 births
Brock University alumni
Canadian citizenship judges
Living people
Mayors and reeves of Cumberland
Members of the Executive Council of Ontario
Progressive Conservative Party of Ontario MPPs
21st-century Canadian politicians
Ottawa-Carleton regional councillors